Elections were held in Illinois on Tuesday, November 6, 1990. Primaries were held on March 20, 1990.

All statewide offices saw their incumbents forgo seeking reelection. However, no statewide office saw a change in party composition, with Republicans retaining the governorship and lieutenant governorship in their joint election, as well as the office of Secretary of State, and Democrats retaining the offices of Attorney General, Comptroller, and Treasurer.

Democrats retained their control of both chambers of the Illinois General Assembly.

Election information
1990 was a midterm election year in the United States.

Turnout
For the primaries, turnout was 32.62%, with 1,962,284 ballots cast (with 1,123,972 Democratic ballots, 805,381 Republican ballots, 525 Illinois Solidarity, 21 Independent Progressive, and 32,385 nonpartisan ballots cast).

For the general election, turnout was 56.71%, with 3,420,720 ballots cast.

Straight-ticket voting
Illinois had a straight-ticket voting option in 1990.

Federal elections

United States Senate 

Incumbent Democrat Paul Simon was reelected to a second term.

United States House 

All 22 of Illinois' seats in the United States House of Representatives were up for election in 1990.

The Democratic Party flipped one Republican-held seat, making the composition of Illinois' House delegation 15 Democrats and 7 Republicans.

State elections

Governor and Lieutenant Governor

Incumbent Governor James R. Thompson did not seek reelection to a fifth term. Republican Jim Edgar was elected to succeed him in office, defeating Democrat Neil Hartigan by a narrow margin of about 80,000 votes.

Attorney General 

Incumbent Attorney General Neil Hartigan, a Democrat, did not run for a third term, instead opting to run for governor. Democrat Roland Burris was elected to succeed him in office.

Democratic primary
Illinois Comptroller Roland Burris won the Democratic primary, running unopposed.

Republican primary

General election

Secretary of State 

Incumbent Secretary of State Jim Edgar, a Republican first appointed in 1981 and subsequently reelected to two full terms, did not seek reelection to another term, instead opting to run for governor. Republican George Ryan was elected to succeed him in office.

Democratic primary
Illinois Treasurer Jerome Cosentino won the Democratic primary, running unopposed.

Republican primary
Lieutenant Governor of Illinois George Ryan won the Republican primary, running unopposed.

General election

Comptroller 

Incumbent Comptroller Roland Burris, a Democrat, did not seek reelection to a fourth term, instead opting to run for Attorney General. Democrat Dawn Clark Netsch was elected to succeed him in office.

Democratic primary
State Senator Dawn Clark Netsch defeated attorney Shawn Collins, State Representative Woody Bowman, and Kane County Democratic Party Chairman Bill Sarto.

Republican primary
Republican Sue Suter, the director of the Illinois Department of Public Aid who previously from 1984 until 1988 had been head of the  Illinois Department of Rehabilitation Services, won the Republican primary unopposed. This was Suter's first attempt at elected office.

General election

Treasurer 

Incumbent Treasurer Jerome Cosentino, a Democrat, did not run for what would have been a third overall (second consecutive) term, instead opting to run for Secretary of State. Democrat Pat Quinn was elected to succeed him in office.

Democratic primary
Former Cook County Board of Tax Appeals commissioner and Chicago Revenue Director Pat Quinn defeated State Representative Peg McDonnell Breslin. Quinn previously had been an unsuccessful candidate for the Democratic nomination in 1986.

Breslin had been the candidate endorsed by the Democratic Party organization.

Republican primary
Former Illinois Secretary of Transportation Greg Baise won the Republican primary unopposed.

General election
Baise campaigned on a message of conservatism. Quinn campaigned as a populist reformer in opposition to big government.

During the general election campaign, Quinn won the endorsement of the AFL–CIO.

State Senate
Some of the seats of the Illinois Senate were up for election in 1990. Democrats retained control of the chamber.

State House of Representatives
All of the seats in the Illinois House of Representatives were up for election in 1990. Democrats retained control of the chamber.

Trustees of University of Illinois

An election was held for three of nine seats for Trustees of University of Illinois system for six-year terms.

The election saw the reelection of incumbent Democrat Gloria Jackson Bacon to a second term and incumbent Republican Susan Loving Gravenhorst to a third term, as well as the election of new trustee Democrat Thomas R. Lamont.

Fourth-term incumbent Republican Ralph Crane Hahn lost reelection.

Judicial elections
Multiple judicial positions were up for election in 1990.

Ballot measure
Illinois voters voted on a single ballot measure in 1990. In order to be approved, the measure required either 60% support among those specifically voting on the amendment or 50% support among all ballots cast in the elections.

Redemption Periods for Property Sold for Non-Payment of Taxes Amendment
Voters approved the Redemption Periods for Property Sold for Non-Payment of Taxes Amendment, a legislatively referred constitutional amendment which amended Article IX, Section 8 of the Constitution of Illinois to reduce the redemption period on the tax sale of certain delinquent properties.

Local elections
Local elections were held. These included county elections, such as the Cook County elections.

References

 
Illinois